Anomopsocus is a genus of fateful barklice in the family Lachesillidae. There are at least two described species in Anomopsocus.

Species
These two species belong to the genus Anomopsocus:
 Anomopsocus amabilis (Walsh, 1862)
 Anomopsocus radiolosus (Roesler, 1940)

References

Lachesillidae
Articles created by Qbugbot